Lobelia browniana is a species of flowering plant in the family Campanulaceae and is endemic to eastern Australia. It is an erect, glabrous, annual plant with narrow leaves and one-sided racemes of blue flowers with long, soft hairs in the centre.

Description

Taxonomy
Lobelia browniana was first formally described in 1819 by Josef August Schultes in Systema Vegetabilium. The taxon had been given given the name Lobelia stricta in 1810 by Robert Brown but the name was illegitimate.

Distribution and habitat
This lobelia grows in forest and woodland in scattered locations in New South Wales, Victoria, South Australia, Queensland and Tasmania.

References

browniana
Flora of South Australia
Flora of Queensland
Flora of New South Wales
Flora of Victoria (Australia)
Flora of Tasmania
Plants described in 1819
Taxa named by Josef August Schultes